The State Kremlin Palace, previously and unofficially known as the Kremlin Palace of Congresses (Кремлёвский дворец съездов), is a large modern building inside the Moscow Kremlin.

History
The building was built at the initiative of Nikita Khrushchev as a modern arena for Communist Party meetings. The building replaced several heritage buildings, including the old neo-classical building of the State Armoury, and some of the back corpuses of the Great Kremlin Palace. This, and that the architecture of the projected building contrasted with the historic milieu resulted in quite an uproar, particularly after other historic buildings of the Kremlin, such as the Chudov and Ascension cloisters, had already been demolished during the Stalin era and laws, that were introduced by the mid-1950s, prohibited the demolishion of historic structures, making the construction in some ways illegal.

The construction work started in 1959 and the building was opened along with the 22nd Congress of the Communist Party of the Soviet Union on October 17, 1961.
Over the years this was the main place for mass state events (particularly party congresses).

Presently it is used for official and popular concerts. American singers Mariah Carey, Tina Turner and Cher have played in the palace, as did Norwegian band A-HA and Canadian poet and singer-songwriter Leonard Cohen.

Architecture
The building is a modern glass and concrete design, with nearly half of it (17 metres) submerged underground. Externally the palace is faced with white marble and the windows are tinted and reflective, which makes the classic architecture in the Kremlin appear particularly picturesque.

The palace was subsequently integrated into the larger complex of the Great Kremlin Palace.

Architecture and interiors 
The State Kremlin Palace was designed in the style of Soviet modernism, which marked a departure from Stalinist architecture. The building is characterised by stylistic integrity and monumentality. As the researchers note, its "three-dimensional composition, the architectural solution of the facades and the state interiors are closely linked". The palace has a rectangular shape and a volume of about 40,000 m³. It has over 800 rooms. The central part of the building is occupied by an auditorium (in Soviet times, a conference hall) for 6,000 seats.

Architectural historian Andrey Ikonnikov notes the openness of the internal layout of the palace and its interiors. In his view, the gradual transitions between the foyer and the lobbies employed the principle of "shimmering construction of space", which symbolised continuity with the architectural experiments of the Soviet avant-garde of the 1920s.

The building's exterior combines vertical protrusions with mirrored openings between them. The façades are clad in white Ural marble and anodised aluminium. Red Karbakhta granite, Koelga marble and patterned Baku tuff, and various types of wood were used inside. A gilded coat-of-arms of the USSR, made by sculptor Alexei Zelenski, was located above the main entrance. The symbol was later replaced by the coat of arms of the Russian Federation. The interior decoration of the palace was done by the artist Alexander Deineka, who made mosaic emblems in the banquet hall and the frieze in the foyer.

Party congresses in the Kremlin Palace

In popular culture 
In Tom Clancy's 1986 novel Red Storm Rising, the building is bombed in a false-flag operation by the KGB to justify an invasion of Western Europe, with West Germany being framed for the attack. The building is depicted as being the meeting place for the Council of Ministers. Ordinarily, the Council convened in the Kremlin Senate, which is explained in the novel as being closed for repairs.

See also
 Congress of the Communist Party of the Soviet Union 
 Palace of the Republic
 House of the Unions
 Palace of the Soviets
 Great Hall of the People, Beijing
 April 25 House of Culture, Pyongyang
 United States Capitol, Washington D.C.

External links
Official site
Description on the Official page of the Kremlin museum 
Description on the Official page of the Presidency 
Satellite shot centred on the building

References

Legislative buildings in Europe
Palaces in Moscow
Government buildings in Russia
Government buildings completed in 1961
Moscow Kremlin
Theatres in Moscow
Music venues in Russia
Headquarters of political parties